Brent Thompson is an American college football coach, most recently served as head coach of The Citadel Bulldogs football team.  He was named to that position after the 2015 season. The Citadel and Thompson parted ways following back to back 4-7 seasons in 2021 and 2022.

Head coaching record

References

{The Citadel Bulldogs football coach navbox}}

Year of birth missing (living people)
Living people
American football defensive backs
Bucknell Bison football coaches
The Citadel Bulldogs football coaches
Dickinson Red Devils football coaches
Lenoir–Rhyne Bears football coaches
Northeastern Huskies football coaches
Norwich Cadets football players
Stony Brook Seawolves football coaches